Chief Jeff Ajueshi (born July 20, 1978) curator and gallerist in Nigeria. In 2007, he founded Thought Pyramid Art Centre in Abuja, Nigeria’s Federal Capital Territory.In these intervening years, Thought Pyramid has become the creative space that focuses on the interplay between visual art and culture.

Early life 
Jeff Ajueshi was born on July 20, 1978,in Benin City,Edo State of Nigeria.  Born into the family of Chief I.T. Ajueshi of Oghara in Ethiope West Local Government Area of Delta State,He went to Edo College, Benin City, Nigeria.  He obtained a Bachelor's degree from Ambrose Ali University  in 2001 and a Christie's eductaion on Art History, Criticism and Conservation

Career 
Jeff O Ajueshi is an art curator and Gallerist in Nigeria. In 2007, he founded Thought Pyramid Art Centre in the heart of Wuse II Abuja ,before moving to the massively spaced gallery at  18 Libreville Crescent, Wuse II, Abuja, Federal Capital Territory and in another massive space at 96 Norman Williams Street, Ikoyi , Lagos.In the intervening years, it has become a space that focuses on the interplay between the visual art and culture.Thought Pyramid Art Centre has curated over more than 72 exhibitions. In response to the need for a purpose-built space for artists and art lovers to interact, Jeff Ajueshi has constructed The first Private Art Centre in Wuse II, Abuja & Ikoyi,Lagos In his commitment to advance contemporary art in Nigeria, Jeff created the Foundation for Arts and Creative Training (FACT), an Artist residency programme located in Oghara, Delta state. Through this programme, Jeff has positively impact unemployed youths in Niger Delta.Jeff has provided thought leadership in the Nigeria art space. He is a sought-after lecturer and discussant on 'collaborative strategies' and 'professional practice' in colleges of arts and design in Nigeria. He has also continued to manage a diverse range of art projects including The Children Art Club, Catch Them Young Initiative, Life Drawing Platform, and many other innovative projects,him and his wife Nnenne Anita Ajueshi own Abstractikoyi restaurant located in the same premises as the Thought Pyramid Art Centre,Lagos as well as The Lakeyard Restaurant and Lakeyard Cultural Centre located at Plot 1, Waterboard Road, Ogharaefe, opposite Kings & Queens, in his hometown of Oghara,Delta State.Jeff Ajueshi is referred to as a great pioneer in the Nigerian Art Industry and is a member of the Art Gallery Association of Nigeria,he has won numerous awards in Nigeria,Africa and around the world and has been interviewed by many newspapers around the world.In his career as a curator, Ajueshi has attended various leadership art business and curatorial programmes in London, New York, Marrakesh, Venice and Vienna, among others. For the past 15 years, Thought Pyramid Art Centre has represented over 400 artists directly and indirectly, helping them with promotion, presentation, preservation and sales.Ajueshi and his company have over the years participated in a couple of fairs, from New York to Dubai and Miami.Ajueshi has welcomed many international and national government officials to his galleries.

Personal life
Jeff Ajueshi is a chief in his native town Oghara where he was crowned Obarisi.He is married to his wife,Nnenne Anita Ajueshi and together they have beautiful and handsome kids.

References

External links